Lekhani may refer to:

Lekhani, Dhawalagiri, Nepal
Lekhani, Sagarmatha, Nepal